The South–North Water Transfer Project, also translated as the South-to-North Water Diversion Project is a multi-decade infrastructure mega-project in China. Ultimately it aims to channel 44.8 billion cubic meters of fresh water annually from the Yangtze River in southern China to the more arid and industrialized north through three canal systems: 
The Eastern Route through the course of the Grand Canal;
The Central Route from the upper reaches of Han River (a tributary of Yangtze River) via the Grand Aqueduct to Beijing and Tianjin;
The Western Route which goes from three tributaries of Yangtze River near the Bayankala Mountain to provinces like Qinghai, Gansu, Shaanxi, Shanxi, Inner Mongolia and Ningxia.

Mao Zedong discussed the idea for a mass engineering project as an answer to China's water problems as early as 1952. He reportedly said, "there's plenty of water in the south, not much water in the north. If at all possible; borrowing some water would be good." Construction began in 2003.

By 2014, more than $79 billion had been spent, making it one of the most ambitious and expensive engineering projects in human history.

East route
The Eastern Route Project (ERP) consists of an upgrade to the Grand Canal, and will be used to divert a fraction of the total flow of the Yangtze River to Northern China. According to Chinese hydrologists, the entire flow of the Yangtze at the point of its discharge into the East China Sea is, on average, 956 km3 per year; the annual flow does not fall below around 600 km3 per year even in driest years. As the project progresses, the amount of water to be diverted to the north will increase from 8.9 km3/year to 10.6 km3/year to 14.8 km3/year.

Water from the Yangtze River will be drawn into the canal in Jiangdu, where a giant 400 m³/s (12.6 billion m3/year if operated continuously) pumping station was built in the 1980s. The water will then be pumped by stations along the Grand Canal and through a tunnel under the Yellow River and down an aqueduct to reservoirs near Tianjin. Construction on the Eastern route began officially on December 27, 2002, and water was expected to reach Tianjin by 2013. However, in addition to construction delays, water pollution has affected the viability of the route. Initially the route was expected to provide water for the provinces of Shandong, Jiangsu and Hebei, with trial operations to begin in mid-2013. Water started arriving in Shandong in 2014, and it is expected 1 billion cubic meters will be transferred in 2018.

As of Oct 2017 water has reached  Tianjin. Tianjin is expected to receive 1 billion m3/year. The Eastern route is not expected to supply Beijing which is to be supplied by the central route.

The completed line will be slightly over 1,152 km (716 miles) long, equipped with 23 pumping stations with a power capacity of 454 megawatts.

An important element of the Eastern Route will be a tunnel crossing under the Yellow River, on the border of Dongping and Dong'e Counties of Shandong Province. The crossing will consist of two 9.3 m diameter horizontal tunnels, positioned 70 m under the riverbed of the Yellow River.

Due to the topography of the Yangtze Plain and the North China Plain, pumping stations will be needed to raise water from the Yangtze to the Yellow River crossing; farther north, the water will be flowing downhill in an aqueduct.

Central route

The central, or middle, route runs from Danjiangkou Reservoir on the Han river, a tributary of the Yangtze River, to Beijing. This project involved raising the height of the Danjiangkou dam by increasing the dam crest elevation from 162 m to 176.6 m above the sea level. This addition to the dam's height allowed the water level in the reservoir to rise from 157m to 170 m above the sea level.  And this, allowed the flow into the water diversion canal to begin "downhill", pulled by gravity, to the lower elevation of the canals.

The middle route, also colloquially known as the Grand Aqueduct, is built on and across the North China Plain. The canal was constructed so that gravity is the force pushing the flow of the water all the way from the Danjiangkou Reservoir to Beijing, without the need for pumping stations. The greatest engineering challenge of the route was the building of two tunnels under the Yellow River, to carry the canal's flow. Construction on the central route began in 2004. In 2008, the 307 km-long northern stretch of the central route was completed at a cost of US$2 billion. Water in that stretch of the canal does not come from the Han River but from reservoirs in Hebei Province, south of Beijing. Farmers and industries in Hebei had to cut back on water consumption to allow for water to be transferred to Beijing.

On Google Maps, one can see the canal's intake at the Danjiangkou Reservoir, its crossing of the Baihe River north of Nanyang, Henan, the Shahe River in 
Lushan County, Henan, the Ying River in Yuzhou, Henan, and the Yellow River upstream from Zhengzhou. The canal eventually reaches the southwestern suburbs of Beijing in the Juma River valley in Zhuozhou, Hebei.

The whole project was expected to be completed around 2010. Final completion was in 2014 to allow for more environmental protections to be built along the route. One problem was the impact of the project on the Han River, below the Danjiangkou Dam, from which approximately one-third of the water is diverted. One long-term solution being considered is to build another canal to divert water from the Three Gorges Dam to Danjiangkou Reservoir.  On Friday, Dec. 12, 2014, the middle leg of China's South to North Water Project, the world's largest water transfer project to date, opened.

Another major challenge was the resettlement of around 330,000 persons who were living near Danjiangkou Reservoir (at its prior, lower elevation), and along the route of the canal. On October 18, 2009, Chinese officials began to relocate residents from the areas of the Hubei and Henan provinces who were to be affected by the reservoir. The completed canal route is approximately 1,264 km long, initially providing 9.5 km3 of water annually. By 2030, water transfers is expected to increase to 12 to 13 km3 annually, although in dry years the annual amount transferred will be less (at least 6.2 km3, with a 95% guarantee rate).

Industries are prohibited from locating on the reservoir's watershed to keep its water drinkable.

West route
There are long-standing plans to divert about 200 billion cubic metres of water annually from the upstream sections of six rivers in southwestern China, including the Mekong (Lancang River), the Yarlung Zangbo (called Brahmaputra further downstream) and the Salween (Nu River), to the Yangtze River, the Yellow River and ultimately to the dry areas of northern China through a system of reservoirs, tunnels and natural rivers. The project was considered too immense and costly to be undertaken at the time. The respective rivers are transboundary and diversion could affect India and Bangladesh in South Asia, and Myanmar, Laos, Thailand, Cambodia and Vietnam in Southeast Asia.

Financing
In 2008, construction costs for the eastern and central routes was estimated to be 254.6 billion yuan ($37.44 billion). The government had budgeted only 53.87 billion yuan ($7.9 billion), less than a quarter of the total cost, at that time. This included 26 billion from the central government and special accounts, 8 billion from local governments, and almost 20 billion in loans. As of 2008, around 30 billion yuan had been spent on the construction of the eastern (5.66 billion yuan) and central routes (24.82 billion yuan). Costs of the projects have increased significantly.

Project controversy
The project required resettling at least 330,000 people in central China. Critics have warned the water diversion will cause environmental damage and some villagers said officials had forced them to sign agreements to relocate.

In the summer of 2013, complaints arrived from the fish farmers on the Dongping Lake, on the project's Eastern Route, in Shandong, reporting that the polluted Yangtze River water entering the lake was killing their fish.

Scientists have been concerned that the project will increase water evaporation losses. The exact amount of evaporation loss is not known, but it may be improved in the future as more water is transferred and the flow rate increases.

See also
Water resources of China
Meng Xuenong, the project's deputy director 2003-07
Irtysh–Karamay–Ürümqi Canal, in Xinjiang province
NAWAPA Similar (unbuilt) project in North America
Siberian River Reversal Similar (unbuilt) project in the Former Soviet Union

References

External links
Official Website: 中国南水北调 (in Chinese) / South-to-North Water Diversion (in English)
RitchieWiki: South-North Water Transfer Project
CNN: Thirsty China to divert the mighty Yangtze, 15 November 2001
Water industry article
New York Times: Beneath Booming Cities, China’s Future Is Drying Up, 28 September 2007
New York Times: Map of South-North Project

Aqueducts in China
Proposed infrastructure in China
Proposed canals
Interbasin transfer
Environmental issues in China
Irrigation in China
Canals in China
Macro-engineering
Megaprojects